Titus Flavius may refer to

Titus Flavius Vespasianus, the Roman Emperor Titus
Titus Flavius Domitianus, the Roman Emperor Domitian
Titus Flavius Sabinus Vespasianus, the Roman Emperor Vespasian
Titus Flavius Clemens (consul), consul and cousin of Domitian
Clement of Alexandria

Flavii